John Thomas Canty (April 24, 1854 – May 1, 1920) was an American jurist.

Career
Born in London, United Kingdom, Canty emigrated with his parents to the United States and settled in Detroit, Michigan and Lawler, Iowa. Canty moved to Minneapolis, Minnesota in 1880 and was admitted to the Minnesota bar in 1881. Canty served as a Minnesota district court judge for Hennepin County, Minnesota. He then served on the Minnesota Supreme Court from 1894 to 1899. Canty emigrated to Brazil to develop plantations and colonization projects. Canty died at his home in Currantinha, Brazil after getting lost while on an exploration, for three days, and being without food or water dying as a result from the effects.

Notes

1854 births
1920 deaths
English emigrants to the United States
American emigrants to Brazil
People from Chickasaw County, Iowa
Lawyers from Detroit
Lawyers from London
Politicians from Minneapolis
Minnesota state court judges
Justices of the Minnesota Supreme Court
19th-century American lawyers